Dalton House was a historic home located at Dalton, Lackawanna County, Pennsylvania. It was built in 1810, and was a two-story, frame dwelling.  It featured a two-story, full-length front porch with Stick/Eastlake style ornamentation.

It was added to the National Register of Historic Places in 1978.  It was delisted in 2002, after being demolished in 1999.

References

Houses on the National Register of Historic Places in Pennsylvania
Houses completed in 1810
Houses in Lackawanna County, Pennsylvania
National Register of Historic Places in Lackawanna County, Pennsylvania
Demolished buildings and structures in Pennsylvania
Buildings and structures demolished in 1999